John Kenneth Hilton (born 15 June 2001), occasionally known as Xuxuh Hilton, is a footballer who plays as a left-back for Dutch club Koninklijke.

Club career
Having started his career with Chivas USA, Hilton moved to the Netherlands in 2015 to join Dutch giants Ajax. However, after having his move investigated by FIFA, Hilton was told to return to the United States, which he did in 2016, joining LA Galaxy.

International career
Hilton was born in the United States to an American father and Brazilian mother. He is a youth international for the United States, having represented the United States U16s.

Career statistics

Club

Notes

References

2001 births
Living people
Soccer players from Long Beach, California
American soccer players
United States men's youth international soccer players
American people of Brazilian descent
Association football defenders
Tweede Divisie players
Eerste Divisie players
Chivas USA players
AFC Ajax players
LA Galaxy players
Koninklijke HFC players
FC Volendam players
American expatriate soccer players
American expatriate sportspeople in the Netherlands
Expatriate footballers in the Netherlands